Municipal elections were held in the Canadian province of Newfoundland and Labrador on September 24, 2013. This article lists the results in selected municipalities. Results are for mayoral elections unless otherwise specified.

Bay Roberts

Clarenville

Conception Bay South

Corner Brook

Mayor

City Council

Gander

Grand Falls-Windsor

Happy Valley-Goose Bay

Labrador City

Marystown

Mount Pearl

Paradise

Portugal Cove-St. Philip's

St. John's

Mayor

Deputy mayor

City Council

Ward 4 by-election, February 23, 2016

Stephenville

Torbay

References

2013 elections in Canada
2013